The 1989 .05 500 was an endurance race for Group 3A Touring Cars. The event was held at the Sandown circuit in Victoria, Australia on 10 September 1989 over 161 laps of the 3.10 km circuit, a total distance of 499 km. It was the 24th "Sandown 500". The race was sponsored by the Victorian Health Promotion Foundation with the race name  referencing the blood alcohol limit for driving on Victorian roads.

The race was won by Jim Richards and Mark Skaife driving a Nissan Skyline HR31 GTS-R for Nissan Motor Sport. It was the last race in Australia for six time "Sandown 500" winner and defending race winner Allan Moffat who retired at the end of 1989.

Classes
Cars competed in three classes:
 Class A: 2501cc & over
 Class B: 1601cc-2500cc
 Class C: under 1600cc

Top Ten Shootout
The Top Ten Shootout, which determined the final grid order of the fastest ten cars from Qualifying, was run on a wet track. As a result, times were between 5 and 12 seconds slower than the drivers qualifying times.

Official results

Notes
 Pole Position - #17 Dick Johnson - 1:20.61
 Fastest Lap - #6 Andrew Miedecke - 1:17.02

See also
1989 Australian Touring Car season

References

Further reading
Australian Auto Action, September 22, 1989, pages 16–19 & 25-35
Australian Touring Car Racing Annual, 1989, pages 62–66

Motorsport at Sandown
1989 in Australian motorsport
Pre-Bathurst 500